John Morgan (born February 4, 1963) is an American wrestler. He competed in the men's Greco-Roman 82 kg at the 1988 Olympics, placing 7th. He was a four time national champion (1988-1991), member of the U.S. World Team (1989-1991), and a four-time All-American (1982-83 to 1985-86).  He was also a 1981 Minnesota State High School wrestling champion at 155 pounds.

In 2004, the Minnesota Wrestling Coaches Association inducted Morgan into the Dave Bartelma Hall of Fame

Early life
Morgan was born in Bloomington, Minnesota and attended Kennedy High School in Bloomington and North Dakota State University.

References

External links
 

1963 births
Living people
American male sport wrestlers
Olympic wrestlers of the United States
Sportspeople from Minneapolis
Wrestlers at the 1988 Summer Olympics
Pan American Games medalists in wrestling
Pan American Games bronze medalists for the United States
Wrestlers at the 1991 Pan American Games
Medalists at the 1991 Pan American Games
20th-century American people
21st-century American people